Lucien Rebuffic (December 22, 1924 – January 4, 1997) was a French basketball player who competed in the 1948 Summer Olympics. He was part of the French basketball team, which won the silver medal.

References

External links
Lucien Rebuffic's profile at databaseOlympics

1924 births
1997 deaths
People from Bois-Colombes
French men's basketball players
Olympic basketball players of France
Basketball players at the 1948 Summer Olympics
Olympic silver medalists for France
Olympic medalists in basketball
Medalists at the 1948 Summer Olympics
Sportspeople from Hauts-de-Seine